The Iranian American Women Foundation (IAWF) is an Iranian American national nonprofit membership organization. Members of all faiths, including Muslims, Jews, Christians and those of the Bahá'í faith, are involved in the organization.

History
In 2010, Mariam Khosravani sought to form an organization to highlight the accomplishments of Iranian American women.

Activities

Iranian American Women's Leadership Conference

Since its inception, the Iranian American Women Foundation has hosted their annual Women's Leadership Conference in various cities across the United States.

9th Annual 2015 Women's Leadership Conference
Date: October 18, 2015
Location: New York University School of Law in New York City, New York

8th Annual 2015 Women's Leadership Conference
Date: May 3, 2015
Location: San Francisco, California

7th Annual 2014 Women's Leadership Conference
Date: November 2, 2014 
Location: Beverly Hilton in Beverly Hills, California

2013 Women's Leadership Conference
Date: October 27, 2013
Location: New York City, New York

2013 Women's Leadership Conference
Date: September 8, 2013
Location: Costa Mesa, California

2012 Women's Leadership Conference
Date: September 23, 2012
Location: Irvine, California

2012 Women's Leadership Conference
Date: June 23, 2012
Location: World Bank in Washington, D.C.

References

Iranian-American culture in California
Iranian-American culture in New York (state)
Iranian-American culture in Washington, D.C.
Iranian-American organizations
2010 establishments in the United States
Non-profit organizations based in California
501(c)(3) organizations
Organizations based in Irvine, California